Group E is a formula racing class governed by the FIA for racing cars. Group E was first mentioned in Appendix J of the International Sporting Code in 1990.

Summary
Group E features very few technical regulations. For safety regulations the articles refer to the category (I, II or III) the car is comparable with.

Group E features four different subclasses:

 Category I: Vehicles comparable to Category I must comply with the homologation criteria of  Group N, Group A or Group R and have at least 4 seats and their original structure must remain identifiable at any time.  
 Category II-SH: Silhouette-type cars (Cars with the appearance of a large production car with 4 seats);
 Category II-SC: Sports cars (Two seater competition cars, open or closed, built especially for competition);
 Category II-SS: Single-seater track type cars of International Formula or Free Formula cars.

Cars
Many cars fall within the rules of Group E. Examples are the Tatuus N.T07 (SS) and the Renault Mégane Trophy (SH).

References

External links
 FIA Group E regulations

Fédération Internationale de l'Automobile
Touring car racing
Sports car racing
Open wheel racing